Thomas of Zumárraga and Lazcano (9 March 1577 – 12 September 1622) was a Roman Catholic Missionary from Spain. He was beatified in May 1867 by Pope Pius IX.

Biography 
Thomas was born in Vitoria, in 1577. In 1594, he was professed in the Order of Preachers in Vitoria. After he entered the Convento de San Esteban de Salamanca, he received the name of Fray Tomás del Espíritu Santo (Brother Thomas of the Holy Spirit). In 1601, he was sent to Mexico en route to the Philippines.  Shortly after arriving, in 1603, Fray Francisco Morales, superior of the Dominicans in Manila, sent him to Japan to found a mission.

He hid in the mountains, in the area of Nagasaki and Ōmura. He was captured on 23 July 1617. After five years of imprisonment, he was burnt alive on 12 September 1622.

References 

1577 births
1622 deaths
17th-century Roman Catholic martyrs
17th-century Spanish Roman Catholic theologians
17th-century venerated Christians
Beatifications by Pope Pius IX
Dominican beatified people
Dominican martyrs
People executed by Japan by burning
People from Vitoria-Gasteiz
Roman Catholic missionaries in Japan
Spanish beatified people
Spanish Dominicans
Spanish people executed abroad